Rudi Setiawan (born January 13, 1993) is an Indonesian semi-professional footballer who plays as a winger for Liga 3 club Raga Negeri. He previously plays for Persija Jakarta and In the 2014 season, he was loaned to Martapura Persistence and perseverance play football deliver Rudi accomplishment, arguably very impressive for a player his age. In the football tournament Manchester United Preimer Cup 2008, Rudi won three awards, namely Best Midfielder, top scorer (13 goals), and Player of the Year.

Career

His first football career when he was still in SSB Serpong, and then went to SSB Villa 2000. At that time, because football is very good talent, he was finally put into the squad
Villa 2000 to go to England and followed Manchester United Preimer Cup 2008. As a result there he became top scorer at the same time best players.
And he started his senior career when following Selection Persija U-21 in 2010, and he managed to escape and strengthen the U-21 Persija Jakarta in Indonesia Super League U-21 at the time. In 2011, he managed to get into the squad Persija Jakarta in ISL 2012 season, but because
Indonesia Super League U-21 held again, he got back to Persija U-21. In the 2014 season, he was loaned to Martapura FC.

References

External links

1993 births
Living people
Indonesian footballers
Association football wingers
Persija Jakarta players
Sportspeople from Jakarta